Solar power in New Hampshire provides a small percentage of the state's electricity. State renewable requirements and declining prices have led to some installations. Photovoltaics on rooftops can provide 53.4% of all electricity used in New Hampshire, from 5,300 MW of solar panels, and 72% of the electricity used in Concord, New Hampshire. A 2016 estimate suggests that a typical 5 kW system costing $25,000 before credits and utility savings will pay for itself in 9 years, and generate a profit of $34,196 over the rest of its 25-year life. A loan or lease provides a net savings each year, including the first year. New Hampshire has a rebate program which pays $0.75/W for residential systems up to 5 kW, for up to 50% of the system cost, up to $3,750. However, New Hampshire's solar installation lagged behind nearby states such as Vermont and New York, which in 2013 had 10 times and 25 times more solar, respectively.

Net metering is available for up to 1 MW generation, but is capped at 50 MW. Excess generation is perpetually rolled over each month, and customers can elect to be paid at avoided cost once a year. The organization Freeing the Grid gave the state a B for net metering and a D for interconnection. The state renewable portfolio standard calls for 25% of electricity from renewable energy in 2025, including 0.3% from solar. Noncompliance fees are used to fund renewable energy, and resulted in payments of $1.3 million in 2009 and $2.6 million in 2010. A 2014 review by the state found the "business-as-usual" model predicted that the state's 2025 goals would not be met.

In 2005, New Hampshire's largest solar array was the 50 kW installation on the roof of the Stonyfield Farm yogurt factory. It remained the largest in the state until PSNH installed a 51 kW array on their roof in 2009. In 2012, New Hampshire's largest solar array was the 525 kW facility on the top level of the Manchester Airport parking garage. It was removed because of glare, and reinstalled with the panels facing East instead of South. Additional panels were installed to maintain the same output.
In 2022, Manchester became home to the state's largest municipal solar array, which will generate 3.8 million kilowatt-hours. The facility is located on top of a land-fill
 

In a pilot program, a solar panel was installed on a few utility poles, four in Nashua and four in Berlin.

New Hampshire's average electricity price of 18.98¢/kWh is the fifth highest in the country.

Installed capacity

See also
Wind power in New Hampshire
Solar power in the United States
Renewable energy in the United States

References

External links

 Incentives and policies

Energy in New Hampshire
New Hampshire